The Reykjavík College of Music is an Icelandic conservatory of music that was founded in 1930 and is the oldest surviving college of music in the country. It offers music education at intermediate, continuing, and university levels. Students graduate with a degree equivalent to a B.A. in performance, singing or composition or a B.Ed. in Music education.

The Reykjavík College of Music also operates a symphony orchestra (Orchestra of the Reykjavík College of Music), whose purpose is to train students in performance.

References

External links
 Reykjavík College of Music (Icelandic)

 
Educational institutions established in 1930
Music schools in Iceland
Education in Reykjavík
1930 establishments in Iceland